Thread-locking fluid or threadlocker is a single-component adhesive, applied to the threads of fasteners such as screws and bolts to prevent loosening, leakage, and corrosion.

Most thread-locking formulas are methacrylate-based and rely on the electrochemical activity of a metal substrate to cause polymerization of the fluid. Thread-locking fluid is thixotropic, which allows it to flow well over time, yet still resist shocks and vibrations. It can be permanent or removable; in the latter case, it can be removed with heat, for example. Typically, brands are color-coded to indicate strength and whether they can be removed easily or if they require heat for removal.

History 

Thread-locking fluid was developed by American professor Vernon K. Krieble in 1953. His company, American Sealants, founded the Loctite brand. An early version of the compound was patented in 1960.

Properties 

Typically, thread-locking fluids are methacrylate-based, and cure anaerobically. Thread-locking fluid is often a thixotropic fluid: under shear stress, it exhibits a time-dependent decrease in viscosity to allow it to be squeezed into place but not flow too quickly on its own.

Threadlocker is also sold in sticks and in tape form, similar to teflon tape.

Application and care 

Thread-locking fluid may be applied before or after assembly, depending on the type. Threadlockers are available in varieties of "permanent", "removable", and "low-strength" formulas. Many brands color-code the container and the fluid itself to indicate the degree of permanency. The low-strength types prevent loosening under vibration, but may still be readily disassembled. Removable types resist higher amounts of vibration, but may still be disassembled with hand or power tools. The applied torque required to loosen a permanently threadlocked fastener may exceed the yield strength of the fastener itself, such that attempting disassembly by force may twist off the stem of the fastener. However, high-strength permanent threadlockers become potentially removable by heating the assembly, typically to 230°C (450°F).

Working temperatures for threadlocked fasteners are typically limited to 150°C (300°F), which is below the softening point of the methacrylate polymer. Above this temperature, the material softens and strength reduces.

Because thread locking adhesives typically rely on the electrochemical activity of a metal substrate to form a bond, surfaces must be clean to develop the full bonding strength. In the case of less electrochemically active metals such as the normally oxidised surface of aluminium, an additional step of priming is required for full strength results.

Lock washers, locknuts, jam nuts, and safety wire may be used in conjunction with thread-locking fluid to prevent loosening of bolted joints.

Because electrochemical activity is one of the two triggers that cause polymerization of the threadlocker fluid, care must be taken to avoid contaminating the entire threadlocker container with threadlocker that has had contact with metal, or the material in the container may polymerize.

References

External links 

 
 Current Loctite Threadlockers
 Threadlocker

Adhesives
Acrylate polymers
Non-Newtonian fluids
Screws